This is a list of historic house museums in Mexico. They are the birthplaces of some Mexican leaders and heroes. Some preserve the original structure, and others are near-exact replicas.